Vameq III Dadiani (also Vamiq; ; died 1661) was Prince of Mingrelia, of the House of Dadiani, from 1658 until being deposed in 1661. He was also briefly King of Imereti in 1661. He assumed both Mingrelian and Imeretian thrones and lost them during a messy civil war in western Georgian polities and was killed by assassins while hiding in a refuge of the mountains of Svaneti.

Prince of Mingrelia 
Vameq was born into the Lipartiani family, a younger line of the Dadiani dynasty of Mingrelia, which held the fief of Salipartiano in hereditary possession. Vameq was a son of Giorgi II Lipartiani by his first wife Ana, probably his cousin and a daughter of Giorgi III Dadiani. Vameq succeeded to lordship of Salipartiano in 1618. In 1657, after the death of his relative, Levan II Dadiani, Vameq prevented his rival Liparit III Dadiani from becoming Mingrelia's next ruler. To his cause, Vameq was able to enlist support of King Alexander III of Imereti, but had to concede the border territory Levan II Dadiani had seized from Imereti as well as much of Levan's treasury. At the decisive battle of Bandza in June 1658, Vameq defeated his rival and secured the throne of Mingrelia.

King of Imereti  
In 1660, Alexander III's death occasioned a multifaceted civil war in Imereti, in which the dowager queen Darejan seized power and made her new husband, an insignificant nobleman, Vakhtang, king. The Imeretians revolted: the nobles of Lower Imereti invited Vamiq, while those of Upper Imereti appealed to King Vakhtang V of Kartli. Vamiq took Darejan and his husband prisoner, blinding the latter, and then declared himself king of Imereti in 1661. Darejan begged Vakhtang V of Kartli for help, offering the Imeretian throne to him. The king of Kartli invaded, but stuck a deal with Vameq, dividing Imereti. The agreement was to be cemented by a marriage of Vamiq's daughter to Vakhtang's son, Archil. However, Vameq—anxious that the marriage could eventually be used by Archil as a pretext to lay claim to Imereti—disrupted the agreement and opted for a local son-in-law, Prince Bezhan Gogoberidze. He, further, carried all of Imereti's royal treasury, twelve wagonloads, with him to Mingrelia, together with the captive queen Darejan.

Vakhtang of Kartli responded by recruiting Demetre Gurieli, Prince of Guria, and the Upper Imeretian nobility to kill Gogoberidze. He then occupied Imereti and invaded Mingrelia, capturing Vameq's family and treasury, and forcing the defeated Dadiani into flight to the mountains of Svaneti. Vakhtang installed a loyal prince in Mingrelia, Levan III Dadiani, and then had Vameq assassinated in his mountainous refuge.

Family 
Vameq Dadiani was married to Elene, daughter of Mamia II Gurieli and Tinatin Jaqeli. He fathered three children:
 Bagrat (died 1661);
 Giorgi III Lipartiani, who lost the hereditary fiefdom of Salipartiano to the Chikovani and fled to Russia in 1662;
 Darejan, wife of Prince Bezhan Gogoberidze.

References 

1661 deaths
House of Dadiani
17th-century people from Georgia (country)
Kings of Imereti
17th-century murdered monarchs